The Northwest Collegiate Rugby Conference (NCRC) is a college rugby conference in the United States. The conference spans Washington, Idaho, and Oregon.

Members

East Division
 Boise State                                          
 Eastern Washington                     
 Gonzaga                                                
 Washington State

West Division
 Oregon
 Oregon State
 Washington
 Western Oregon
 Western Washington
 Lewis & Clark College
 Reed College
 River Rats Rugby

References

External links